Jean-Luc Van Den Heede (born 8 June 1945 in Amiens) is a French sailor. He is best known for his achievements in single-handed sailing  and set the current world-record for the westabout circumnavigation (he holds the overall record, i.e. although he sailed solo, nobody was faster on this route with a crewed boat). He also holds the record of sailing cape horn 12 times in competitions.

He started sailing at the age of 17. In the Breton port city of Lorient he worked as a mathematics teacher. After 1989 he became a full-time sailor. Among sailors, he is also known by his initials VDH.

Achievements
1977 : 2nd of the Mini Transat
1979 : 2nd of the Mini Transat
1986 : 2nd of the BOC Challenge on Let's Go
1990 : 3rd of the Vendée Globe on 3615 MET
1993 : 2nd of the Vendée Globe on Sofap Helvim
1993 : 4th of the Transat Jacques Vabre
1995 : 3rd of the BOC Challenge on Vendée Entreprises
1998 : 2nd of the Route du Rhum on Algimouss
2002 : Record crossing of the Channel aboard Adrien with Karen Leibovici
2004 : Record westabout circumnavigation in 122d 14h 3min 49s.
2019 : Winner of the 2018 Golden Globe Race

External links
  

French sailors
Single-handed circumnavigating sailors
Sportspeople from Amiens
1989 Vendee Globe sailors
1992 Vendee Globe sailors
French Vendee Globe sailors
Vendée Globe finishers
1945 births
Living people